Deep Jungle is a three-part miniseries that originally aired on PBS on consecutive Sundays from April 17 to May 1, 2005. The miniseries is a part of the twenty-third season of the natural history documentary series Nature. Deep Jungle follows scientists and filmmakers as they use the latest technology to explore the jungles of fourteen countries around the world.

Reception
The series was generally well received. Anita Gates at The New York Times said "the bird that moonwalks as part of its mating dance is pretty amazing," and "the story about Charles Darwin and the moth is just as satisfying." Overall, Gates described it as "a great-looking three-part "Nature" series". The Atlanta Journal-Constitution stated "The joy these scientists take in their work is infectious." Fred Kaufman, executive producer for Nature said that the miniseries "was a big success and we were looking to spin-off stories/people from it." As a result, the Nature episode "True Adventures of the Ultimate Spider-Hunter" was created with arachnologist Martin Nicholas who appeared in "Deep Jungle: Monsters of the Forest".

Episode listing

References

External links
 

PBS original programming
Television series by WNET